The molecular formula C24H31FO6 (molar mass: 434.50 g/mol) may refer to:

 Betamethasone acetate
 Dexamethasone acetate
 Fluperolone acetate
 Flunisolide
 Paramethasone acetate
 Triamcinolone acetonide